Promachus is a genus of robber flies. It is part of the subfamily Asilinae.

See also
 List of Promachus species

References

Asilidae genera
Diptera of Asia